The Dajbabe Monastery is an Orthodox Christian Monastery in Podgorica, Montenegro. It is located in a cave on Dajbabe hill (Dajbabska gora), which raises above Zeta valley (Zetska ravnica). The Dajbabe Monastery was dedicated to Uspenje Bogorodice or the Assumption of Mary, the monastery was founded in 1897. In the beginning, only the space of the cave was used as a sanctuary, with the plan to be expanded later with chapels. The visible part of the church is situated outside the cave, depicting a spacious entrance porch with two belfries. The Dajbabe Monastery also possesses a reliquary with the relics of St. Simeon Dajbabe.

See also
 List of Serbian monasteries
 Metropolitanate of Montenegro

References

Tourist attractions in Podgorica
Serbian Orthodox monasteries in Montenegro
19th-century Serbian Orthodox church buildings